The 2022 season will be Catalans Dragons's 15th consecutive season playing in England's top division of rugby league. During the season, they will compete in the Super League XXVII and the 2022 Challenge Cup.

Preseason  friendlies

Super League

Regular season

Matches
  

All fixtures are subject to change

Challenge Cup

  

All fixtures are subject to change

2022 transfers

Gains

Losses

2022 squad

Table

Notes

References

Castleford Tigers seasons
Castleford Tigers

External links 

 Catalans Dragons official site  — under construction: 
 Catalans Dragons at Superleague.co.uk
 Sang-Et-Or
 The World of Rugby League
 League Unlimited
 Catalans Dragons stats at rugbyleagueproject.com

 
French rugby league teams
Rugby clubs established in 2000
Super League teams
Sport in Perpignan
2000 establishments in France
Rugby league in Catalonia